Garmin Ltd. (shortened to Garmin, stylized as GARMIN, and formerly known as ProNav) is an American, Swiss-domiciled multinational technology company founded in 1989 by Gary Burrell and Min Kao in Lenexa, Kansas, United States, with headquarters in Olathe, Kansas. Since 2010, the company is legally incorporated in Schaffhausen, Switzerland.

The company specializes in GPS technology for automotive, aviation, marine, outdoor, and sport activities. Due to their development in wearable technology, they have also been competing with activity tracker and smartwatch consumer developers such as Fitbit and Apple.

History

Founding and growth 
In 1983, Gary Burrell recruited Min H. Kao from the defense contractor Magnavox while working for the former King Radio. They founded Garmin in 1989 in Lenexa, Kansas, as "ProNav". The company was later renamed "Garmin", a portmanteau of its two founders, Gary Burrell and Min H. Kao. In 1991, the U.S. Army became their first customer.

By 1995, Garmin's sales had reached $105 million, and it had achieved a profit of $23 million. By 1999, sales had reached $233 million and a profit of $64 million. Garmin reported a 2006 total revenue of $1.77 billion, up 73% from $1.03 billion in 2005.

By 2000 Garmin had sold three million GPS devices, and was producing 50 different models. Its products were sold in 100 countries and carried by 2,500 independent distributors. As of August 22, 2000, the company held 35 patents on GPS technology. By the end of June 2000, the company employed 1,205 people: 541 in the United States, 635 in Taiwan, and 29 in the United Kingdom. In April 2018, Garmin launched Connect IQ 3.0  along with new apps—MySwim Pro, Yelp, Trailforks and iHeartRadio. In May 2018, Garmin partnered with the University of Kansas Medical Center to tackle sleep apnea and atrial fibrillation.

Public offering 
The company began public trading on NASDAQ on December 8, 2000. At that time Burrell owned 19,911,155 shares. Kao owned 20,352,803 shares. Together their holdings accounted for 45 percent of the company's stock. Kao's brother, Ruey-Jeng Kao, an attorney in Taipei, owned another 7,984,109 shares, which when combined with Burrell's and Kao's shares constituted 54.22 percent of the shares outstanding.

Acquisitions 

In August 2003, Garmin completed acquisition of UPS Aviation Technologies, Inc. based in Salem, Oregon, a subsidiary of United Parcel Service, Inc., expanding its product line of panel-mounted GPS/NAV/COMM units and integrated cockpit systems for private and commercial aircraft. The acquired company changed its name to Garmin AT, Inc. and continued operations as a wholly owned subsidiary of Garmin International, Inc.

Garmin has acquired Dynastream Innovations, EME Tec Sat SAS (EME), and Digital Cyclone. Dynastream, in Cochrane, Alberta, produces personal monitoring technology (ANT+)—such as foot pods and heart rate monitors for sports and fitness products—and also ultra-low-power and low-cost wireless connectivity devices for a wide range of applications (ANT). EME Tec Sat SAS is the distributor of Garmin's consumer products in France; following the acquisition, EME changed its name to Garmin France SAS. Digital Cyclone Inc (DCI), located in Chanhassen, Minnesota, provides mobile weather solutions for consumers, pilots, and outdoor enthusiasts. Garmin also bought Nautamatic Marine Systems, an Oregon-based company that makes autopilot systems for boats. In July 2011, Garmin finished its acquisition of the German satellite navigation company Navigon.

In 2006, Garmin introduced a new corporate logo, and opened its first retail store, located on Michigan Avenue in Chicago, Illinois.

In 2015, Garmin acquired South Africa's iKubu Ltd. for its Backtracker on-bicycle low power radar system.

In 2018, it was reported that the Garmin subsidiary Navionics had exposed hundreds of thousands of customer records, when its MongoDB database wasn't secured with a password.

In 2019, Garmin acquired Tacx, a privately held Dutch company that designs and manufacturers indoor bike trainers, tools and accessories, as well as indoor training software and applications.

In 2021 Garmin acquired AeroData, a Scottsdale AZ based company that provides aircraft performance software for over 135 airlines worldwide.  The company will continue to operate under the AeroData brand.

Corporate governance 
Burrell retired in 2003 as Garmin's chief executive officer and in 2004 retired as chairman of its board of directors. He remained chairman emeritus until his death in 2019. Kao became CEO in 2003, and chairman in 2004.

In 2005, Forbes estimated Kao's net worth at $1.5 billion. He has donated $17.5 million to the University of Tennessee. The same year Forbes estimated Burrell's net worth as $940 million. Cliff Pemble is the current CEO of Garmin.

July 2020 outage 
On July 23, 2020, Garmin shut down its call centres, website and some online services, including Garmin Connect and flyGarmin, after a ransomware attack encrypted its internal network and some production systems. The company did not say it was a ransomware attack, but company employees writing on social media described it as such, with some speculation about a ransomware strain called WastedLocker later confirmed. Hackers reportedly demanded a $10 million ransom from Garmin. The company instituted a "multi-day maintenance window" to deal with the attack's impacts. Some Garmin online services began to function again on July 27, 2020, though delays in synchronising data with connected applications were expected; Strava anticipated a delay of "a week or longer". Experts speculated that Garmin had paid hackers a reported $10m ransom, or brokered some other kind of deal.

The outage meant Garmin could not receive calls or emails, or conduct online chats. Athlete users of Garmin wearables could not track mileage, location, heart rate, and other data. Pilots were unable to download data for Garmin aircraft navigational systems, preventing flight scheduling. Garmin said there was "no indication" that personal information had been stolen.

Operations 

In 2010, Garmin opened a facility in Cary, North Carolina as part of the Research Triangle Park. Garmin operates in several other countries besides the UK, USA, and Taiwan. It operates as Formar (Belgium), Garmin AMB (Canada), Belanor (Norway), Trepat (Spain), and Garmin-Cluj (Romania).

Products and brands

Marine GPS 
The company's first product was the GPS 100, a panel-mounted GPS receiver aimed at the marine market, priced at $2,500. It made its debut at the 1990 International Marine Technology Exposition in Chicago.

Handheld GPS 

Another early product, a handheld GPS receiver, was sold to military personnel serving in Kuwait and Saudi Arabia during the 1991 Gulf War.

In the early 2000s Garmin launched a series of personal GPS devices aimed at recreational runners called the Forerunner. The Garmin Foretrex is a similar wrist-worn GPS device with two-dimensional GPS tracking and waypoint projection called .

eTrex 

The compact eTrex was introduced in 2000; several models with different features have been released since. The original eTrex, commonly nicknamed "eTrex Yellow", offered a lightweight (5.3 oz/150 g), waterproof, palm-sized 12-channel GPS receiver, along with a battery life of up to 22 hours on two AA-size batteries. It was replaced in 2007 by the eTrex H, which added a high-sensitivity receiver. Other eTrex models include the Summit, Venture, Legend, and Vista, each with various additional features such as WAAS, altimeter, digital compass, city database, and highway maps. Many of these models come in color and expandable-memory versions.

In May 2011 Garmin refreshed the eTrex product line with new mechanical design and support for advances in cartography and hardware technology with its release of the eTrex 10, eTrex 20, and eTrex 30, Garmin became the first company to manufacture and distribute a worldwide consumer navigation product supporting both GPS and GLONASS satellite constellations. On May 13, 2015, Garmin released the eTrex 20x and 30x, which succeeded the eTrex 20 and 30. The main upgrade was a higher resolution screen and 4GB storage, double of the previous models.

On July 2, 2015, Garmin introduced its eTrex Touch line, releasing three models (25, 35 and 35t), all featuring a 2.6" touch screen. The 35t model designation is not used in Europe, but the European market 35 is essentially the 35t, and both the European 25 and 35 include Garmin TopoActive Europe maps and 8GB of internal storage.

The Geko series was a compact line of handheld GPS receivers aimed at the budget or lightweight hiking market.

In 2004, Garmin introduced its 60C line of handheld GPS mapping receivers, featuring increased sensitivity and storage capacity along with a battery life of up to 30 hours in battery-save mode.  This was followed by the 60Cx and 60CSx with improved color map displays.

With the GTM-11, GTM 20 and GTM 25, a Garmin GPS device receives and uses traffic message channel (TMC) information. Also, some Garmin nüvi (1690, 1490T, 1450T, 1390T, 1390, 1350, 1260, 1250 and 265WT, 265T, 265W, 265, 255w and 255) comes with an integrated TMC receiver.

iQue PDA receivers 

In 2003, Garmin launched the iQue line of integrated PDA–GPS receivers. On October 31, 2005, the iQue M4 became the first PDA that did not require a PC to preload the maps. The American version came with built-in maps of North America, while the UK version was supplied pre-loaded with maps of Western Europe.

Dog tracking and training 
On June 2, 2011, Garmin introduced Astro 320.

On June 12, 2014, Garmin introduced T5 and TT15 Collars for Astro and Alpha.

On July 31, 2015, T5 mini and T15 mini collars were added.

On June 16, 2016, Garmin introduced the Astro 430.

On October 10, 2016, Garmin added pairing of the Astro 430 and Alpha 100 to Garmin Smart Watches.

Fishfinders 
Garmin also manufactures a line of sonar fishfinders, including some units that also have GPS capability, and some that use spread spectrum technology.

Laptop GPS and mobile apps 
In April 2008, Garmin launched Garmin Mobile PC, a GPS navigation software program for laptop PCs and other computers, based on the Microsoft Windows operating system, now discontinued.

Garmin offers mobile apps for various purposes for Android, Windows Phone, and for iPhone.

Nüvifone 

In early 2009, Garmin announced it would be manufacturing a location-specific cellular telephone in cooperation with Asus. Called the Garmin-Asus nüvifone G60, the United States release on AT&T was scheduled for October 4, 2009. Four other models in this line have since been released: two Windows Mobile-powered models for the European and Asian market, and two Android models, one for the Europe/Asia market and another for T-Mobile USA.

Personal trainers 
 
The Garmin Edge and certain models of Garmin Forerunner are a suite of GPS-enabled devices for use while running or cycling.

Avionics 
Garmin Aviation offers electronically integrated cockpits for aircraft: panel mount displays, primary flight displays (PFD) and multi-function displays (MFD), transponders, radar, and other types of avionic systems. 
Garmin entered this market in 1991 with the GPS-100AVD panel-mounted receiver. Its first portable unit, the GPS-95, was introduced in 1993. In 1994, the GPS-155 panel-mounted unit was the first GPS receiver on the market to receive full FAA certification for instrument approaches. In 1998, Garmin introduced the GNS-430, an integrated GPS navigation receiver/communications transceiver. That same year, the company rolled out its first integrated GPS, COM, VOR, LOC and glideslope product, the GNS 430. More than 125,000 GNS navigators are now installed in aircraft. Garmin reached its one millionth delivery in November 2017.

The G1000 is an all-glass avionics suite for OEM aircraft, the similar G950 is used in experimental aircraft, and the G600 is a retrofit.

On October 30, 2019, Garmin announced that the Piper M600 and Cirrus Vision Jet would become the first general aviation aircraft certified with the company's emergency autoland system, which is capable of automatically landing the aircraft with the push of a button and will be a part of both aircraft's G3000 integrated avionics suite in 2020. Garmin calls the new technology "Autonomí".
Garmin plans to equip other platforms in 2020, like the TBM 940, and hopes to eventually expand its offer to the G1000 avionics suite. In June 2021, Garmin Autoland won the 2020 Collier Trophy.

Garmin-AT subsidiary 
In 2003, Garmin acquired UPS Aviation Technologies, including that firm's II Morrow Apollo line of aircraft MFD/GPS/NAV/COMM units. II Morrow had been founded in Salem, Oregon in 1982 as a manufacturer of LORAN C marine and general aviation products. In 1982 its aircraft navigator 602 LORAN C receiver permitted point to point navigation. Some examples of its LORAN units are Apollo II 616B Aviation LORAN panel mount (1986), II Morrow Apollo 604 Loran Navigator (1987) and Apollo 820 GPS Flybuddy (1991). In 1986, United Parcel Service (UPS) purchased the company to expand the use of electronic technology in the package delivery and tracking business.

II Morrow shifted focus from marine business to development of package process automation technology for UPS such as vehicle management systems, automated high speed package sorting systems, as well as delivery and tracking systems. In 1999, II Morrow was renamed to UPS Aviation Technologies, and re-focused towards modernizing UPS' Boeing 7xx series Heavy Iron Transport Category Aircraft fleet, as well they also re-entered the general aviation marketplace. It certified the first Gamma 3 WAAS GPS engine for FAA Certified Precision GPS approaches. The new certified WAAS engine yielded vertical and horizontal accuracy of one meter RMS in guidance into airports without existing ILS approaches. This GPS technology met the FAA's TSO-C146a primary navigation standards for en route, terminal and approach phases of flight—with WAAS augmentation as the sole means of navigation.  This primary GPS "sole source" navigation capability was integrated into the CNX-80.  The CNX-80 WAAS GPS/COM/NAV integrated navigator was the first product in the industry approved for primary GPS navigation. It also enabled LPV glideslope approaches without requiring ground nav aids. New LNAV (GPS) approaches provide the accuracy and safety of an ILS—without the ground-based localizer and glideslope equipment. Later, the CNX-80 was renamed the GNS-480, under Garmin.

In 1999: Flight International magazine presented UPS Aviation Technologies with its Aerospace Industry Award for the development of ADS-B, a surveillance technology intended to reduce aviation delays while improving safety.

Wristwear
Garmin produces activity trackers and sports watches, aimed at activities such as running, watersports, golf, cycling and swimming with sensors such as heart rate and gps. Some recent models add Bluetooth music playback and pulse-oximetry.

The Vivofit and Vivosmart ranges are activity trackers. The Garmin Vivofit 3 measures the wearer's duration and quality of sleep, quantifies body movement, records heart rate, counts steps and the number of stairs climbed. Garmin produces the Vivosmart HR. It comes with the touch screen and includes heart rate monitoring, media player controls, smart notifications and phone finder features.

The Forerunner series is aimed primarily at runners, but the watches are more broadly focussed, especially at the higher end. The 735 XT has multi-sport tracking capabilities (automatically switching between sports, for example in a triathlon) and a variety of special profiles for jogging, swimming, cycling, skiing, paddle sports, various weight loss activities, and hiking. It comes with a built-in heart rate sensor and GPS.

The Fenix range, such as the Fenix 6 released in August 2019, is a more rugged, multisport range that also offers a solar charging model.

The Vivomove is a traditionally-styled watch with activity tracking capabilities. It has a built-in accelerometer (calculates distance during indoor workouts, without the need for a foot pod), step counter, auto goal (learns the wearer's activity level and assigns a daily step goal), move bar, and sleep-monitoring capabilities.

Other series include the Quatix aimed at water sports, the D2 aviator watches, the Approach golf watches.

In 2018, Garmin introduced functionality such as maps, Bluetooth music playback, NFC contactless payment (using a digital wallet branded Garmin Pay), and pulse-oximetry for its wristwear.

In October 2018, Garmin announced it has integrated Spotify to its Garmin Fenix 5 Plus and Garmin Forerunner 645 Music GPS sports watch. Garmin was the second smartwatch maker to do so, after Spotify was exclusive to Samsung smartwatches since 2016.

Maps 
Most current Garmin devices can display its current location on a map, which is vector-based and stored in the built-in memory or loaded from additional flash media. The built-in (or 'basemap') displays all country borders and major cities. Garmin offers different maps for purchase, including detailed road maps, topographic maps and nautical maps.  Non-commercial maps are also available and can be displayed on most Garmin GPS devices.

The maps used by Garmin products are currently provided by HERE. Map errors are handled using HERE Map Creator. Errors can be reported using Garmin's report a map error page, or by using the HERE Map Creator.

Sport sponsorship 
In 2007 Garmin began sponsorship of English Premier League football club Middlesbrough in a one-year deal that was carried into a second year for the 2008/09 season.  In 2008 Garmin began sponsorship of cycling team  to promote its Edge line of bicycle computers. In 2015, the team became Cannondale–Garmin.
In 2014 Garmin paired up with Premier League side Southampton FC in a global partnership. Garmin's European head office is located in Southampton.

See also 

 Automotive navigation system
 Comparison of commercial GPS software
 Garmin–Sharp
 Geotab

References

External links 

 Garmin Company web page

 
1989 establishments in Kansas
American brands
Avionics companies
Companies based in Kansas
Companies based in the Kansas City metropolitan area
Companies listed on the New York Stock Exchange
Electronics companies established in 1989
Electronics companies of the United States
Fishing equipment manufacturers
Satellite navigation
Marine electronics
Navigation system companies
Watch brands
2000 initial public offerings
Schaffhausen
Collier Trophy recipients